OpenChrom is an open source software for the analysis and visualization of mass spectrometric and chromatographic data. Its focus is to handle native data files from several mass spectrometry systems (e.g. GC/MS, LC/MS, Py-GC/MS, HPLC-MS), vendors like Agilent Technologies, Varian, Shimadzu, Thermo Fisher, PerkinElmer and others. But also data formats from other detector types are supported recently.

OpenChrom supports only the analysis and representation of chromatographic and mass spectrometric data. It has no capabilities for data acquisition or control of vendor hardware. OpenChrom is built on the Eclipse Rich Client Platform (RCP), hence it is available for various operating systems, e.g. Microsoft Windows, macOS and Linux. It is distributed under the Eclipse Public License 1.0 (EPL). Third-party libraries are separated into single bundles and are released under various OSI compatible licenses.

History 

OpenChrom was developed by Philip Wenig (SCJP, LPIC-1) as part of his PhD thesis at the University of Hamburg, Germany. The focus of the thesis was to apply pattern recognition techniques on datasets recorded by analytical pyrolysis coupled with chromatography and mass spectrometry (Py-GC/MS).

OpenChrom won the Thomas Krenn Open Source Award 2010 as well as the Eclipse Community Award 2011. The developers are also founding members of the Eclipse Science Working Group. After successful commercialization of contract development and services around the OpenChrom project, vendor Lablicate reinforced the commitment to Free/Libre/Open-Source Software with the release of ChemClipse in October 2016, which serves as the base for all OpenChrom products.

Supported data formats 
Each system vendor stores the recorded analysis data in its own proprietary format. That makes it difficult to compare data sets from different systems and vendors. Furthermore, it's a big drawback for interlaboratory tests. The aim of OpenChrom is to support a wide range of different mass spectrometry data formats natively. OpenChrom takes care that the raw data files can't be modified according to the good laboratory practice. To help scientists OpenChrom supports several open formats to import and export the analysis results. In addition, OpenChrom offers its own open source format (*.ocb) that makes it possible to save the edited chromatogram as well as the peaks and identification results.

Mass selective detector 
 Agilent ChemStation *.D (DATA.MS and MSD1.MS)
 AMDIS Library (*.msl)
 Bruker Flex MALDI-MS (*.fid)
 Chromtech (*.dat)
 CSV (*.csv)
 Finnigan (*.RAW)
 Finnigan MAT95 (*.dat)
 Finnigan ITDS (*.DAT)
 Finnigan ITS40 (*.MS)
 Finnigan Element II (*.dat)
 JCAMP-DX (*.JDX)
 Microsoft Excel (*.xlsx)
 mzXML (*.mzXML)
 mzData (*.mzData)
 NetCDF (*.CDF)
 NIST Text (*.msp)
 Open Chromatography Binary (*.ocb)
 Peak Loadings (*.mpl)
 PerkinElmer (*.raw)
 Varian SMS (*.SMS)
 Varian XMS (*.XMS)
 VG MassLab (*.DAT_001;1)
 Shimadzu (*.qgd)
 Shimadzu (*.spc)
 Waters (*.RAW)
 ZIP (*.zip)
 Agilent ICP-MS (*.icp)
 Finnigan ICIS (*.dat)
 mzML (*.mzML)
 mzMLb (*.mzMLb)
 mz5 (*.mz5)
 mzDB (*.mzDB)
 SVG (*.svg)
 MassHunter (*.D)
 Finnigan ICIS (*.dat)
 MassLynx (*.RAW)
 Galactic Grams (*.cgm)
 AnIML (*.animl)
 GAML (*.gaml)
 ...

Flame ionization detector 
 Agilent FID (*.D/*.ch)
 FID Text (*.xy)
 NetCDF (*.cdf)
 PerkinElmer (*.raw)
 Varian (*.run)
 Finnigan FID (*.dat)
 Finnigan FID (*.raw)
 Shimadzu (*.gcd)
 Arw (*.arw)
 AnIML (*.animl)
 GAML (*.gaml)
 ...

Diode-array detection 
 Agilent DAD (*.UV/*.ch)
 ABSciex
 Chromulan
 Shimadzu (*.lcd)
 Waters Empower
 AnIML (*.animl)

Fourier-transform infrared spectroscopy 
 Thermo Galactics (*.spc)
 Thermo Fisher Nicolet (*.spa)
 GAML (*.gaml)

Near-infrared spectroscopy 
 Bruker OPUS (*.0)

Other formats 
 Peak Loadings (*.mpl)
 NIST-DB (*.msp)
 AMDIS (*.msl)
 AMDIS (*.cal)
 AMDIS (*.ELU)
 MassBank (*.txt)
 SIRIUS (*.ms)

Major features 
OpenChrom offers a variety of features to analyze chromatographic data:
 Native handling of chromatographic data (MSD and FID)
 Batch processing support
 Baseline detector support
 Peak detector, integrator support
 Peak deconvolution
 Peaks and mass spectrum identifier support
 Quantitation support
 Filter support (e.g. Mass Fragment and Scan Removal, noise reduction, Savitzky–Golay smoothing, CODA, backfolding)
 Retention time shift support
 Retention index support
 Chromatogram overlay mode
 Support for principal component analysis (PCA)
 Do/undo/redo support
 Integration of OpenOffice/LibreOffice and Microsoft Office
 Extensible by plug-ins
 Chromatogram peak pattern analysis
 Chromatogram and peak database support
 Update support
 Subtract mass spectra support

Releases 
The software was first released in 2010. Each release is named after a famous scientist.

References

External links 
 OpenChrom Homepage

Bioinformatics software
Mass spectrometry software
Chemistry software for Linux
Science software for macOS
Science software for Windows
Chromatography software
Eclipse software